KAAB (1130 AM) is a radio station broadcasting a country music format. Licensed to Batesville, Arkansas, United States, it serves the Batesville area. The station is currently owned by WRD Entertainment, Inc.

KAAB simulcasts KKIK 106.5 FM of Horseshoe Bend, Arkansas.

External links

AAB
Country radio stations in the United States
Radio stations established in 1980
1980 establishments in Arkansas